T cell receptor beta constant 1 is a protein that in humans is encoded by the TRBC1 gene.

References

External links